Mark Sealy (born 24 August 1961) is a Barbadian cricketer. He played in one List A and two first-class matches for the Barbados cricket team in 1988/89.

See also
 List of Barbadian representative cricketers

References

External links
 

1961 births
Living people
Barbadian cricketers
Barbados cricketers
People from Saint Michael, Barbados